Ernest Hemingway: The Collected Stories is a posthumous collection of Hemingway's short fiction, published in 1995. Introduced by James Fenton, it is published in the UK only by Random House as part of the Everyman Library.  The collection is split in two parts.

Part One contains the four individual collections of stories Hemingway published during his lifetime. They are the tiny experimental prose volume, in our time (1924), the much expanded In Our Time (1925, with an extra story added in 1930), Men Without Women (1927) and Winner Take Nothing (1933). In addition, four further stories were first published in Hemingway's first omnibus, The Fifth Column and the First Forty-Nine Stories (1938).

Part Two contains anomalous stories which were added to the collections Hemingway (and others) have since published. It is also includes some stories, fragments and juvenilia that have never before been published in book-form. The collection does, however, limit itself to material that had already appeared in print.

Some material, first published in The Complete Short Stories (1987), is not included in this edition, as Fenton determined that it was not properly classified as short stories. This includes "One Trip Across" and "Tradesman's Return" (the first two parts of To Have and Have Not); and "An African Story" (filleted from various chapters of The Garden of Eden—itself a posthumous novel).

Part One: Stories Collected in Hemingway's Lifetime
From Three Stories and Ten Poems (1923)
 Up in Michigan (1923, revised 1938)
in our time (1924)
 In Our Time (1925 and 1930)
 On the Quai at Smyrna 
 Indian Camp 
 The Doctor and the Doctor's Wife 
 The End of Something
 The Three-Day Blow 
 The Battler 
 A Very Short Story 
 Soldier's Home
 The Revolutionist 
 Mr. and Mrs. Elliot 
 Cat in the Rain 
 Out of Season 
 Cross-Country Snow 
 My Old Man 
 Big Two-Hearted River, Part I
 Big Two-Hearted River, Part II
 Men Without Women (1927)
 The Undefeated
 In Another Country
 Hills Like White Elephants
 The Killers
 Che Ti Dice La Patria?
 Fifty Grand
 A Simple Enquiry
 Ten Indians
 A Canary for One
 An Alpine Idyll
 A Pursuit Race
 Today is Friday
 Banal Story
 Now I Lay Me
  Winner Take Nothing (1933)
 After the Storm  
 A Clean, Well-Lighted Place  
 The Light of the World  
 God Rest You Merry, Gentlemen  
 The Sea Change  
 A Way You'll Never Be  
 The Mother of a Queen  
 One Reader Writes  
 Homage to Switzerland  
 A Day's Wait  
 A Natural History of the Dead 
 Wine of Wyoming
 The Gambler, the Nun, and the Radio
 Fathers and Sons
  Stories from The Fifth Column and the First Forty-Nine Stories (1938)
 The Capital of the World (1936)
 The Snows of Kilimanjaro (1936)
 The Short Happy Life of Francis Macomber (1936)
 Old Man at the Bridge (1938)

Part Two: Stories and Fragments from Posthumous Collections
Uncollected Stories published in Hemingway's Lifetime
The Denunciation (1938)
The Butterfly and the Tank (1938)
Night Before Battle (1939)
Under the Ridge (1939)
Nobody Ever Dies (1939)
The Good Lion (1951)
The Faithful Bull (1951)
A Man of the World (1957)
Get a Seeing-Eyed Dog (1957)
Drafts and Fragments first published in The Nick Adams Stories (1972)
Three Shots
The Indians Moved Away
The Last Good Country
Crossing the Mississippi
Night Before Landing
Summer People
Wedding Day
On Writing
First published in The Complete Short Stories (1987)
A Train Trip
The Porter
Black Ass at the Crossroads
Landscape with Figures
I Guess Everything Reminds You of Something
Great News from the Mainland
The Strange Country
Juvenilia and Pre-Paris Stories
Judgment of Manitou (1916)
A Matter of Colour (1916)
Sepi Jingan (1916)
The Mercenaris (1985)
Crossroads – an Anthology (1985)
Portrait of the Idealist in Love (1985)
The Ash Heel's Tendon (1985)
The Current (1985)

1995 short story collections
Short story collections by Ernest Hemingway
Random House books